Face to Face (2011) is an independent Australian film directed by Michael Rymer, based on the play of the same name, written by Australian playwright David Williamson. The film stars Vince Colosimo, Sigrid Thornton, Luke Ford and Matthew Newton.

Plot
A young construction worker rams into the back of his boss's Jaguar in a fit of anger at being sacked. Rather than fronting court, he is given the chance to explain his actions in a community conference.  This face-to-face confrontation between the young man, his boss, his boss's wife, his co-workers, his best mate and his mother lifts the lid not only on his dysfunctional life but on their workplace dirty laundry, turning all of their lives upside down.

Cast
Vincent Colosimo as Greg Baldoni 
Luke Ford as Wayne Travers 
Matthew Newton as Jack Manning 
Sigrid Thornton as Claire Baldoni 
Lauren Clair as Maureen Travers
Christopher Connelly as Richard Halligan 
Laura Gordon as Julie Rossiter
Robert Rabiah as Hakim Slimon
Ra Chapman as Theresa Martin
Josh Saks as Barry McLean
Dom Phelan as Mac
Glenn Maynard as Nookie
Calen Mackenzie as young Wayne
Richard Sutherland as Stan Travers
James Romeril as Adrian Baldoni
Alicia Attwood as Pub Waitress

Reception
Face to Face is the first commercially released feature film to be shot on Canon HDSLR digital still cameras by photographer/cinematographer Dennys Ilic. From February 2011 to September 2011 Face to Face has won 40 international Film festival awards including the Michael Moore Traverse City Film Festival.The movie also won the award of Best Dramatic feature at the 2012 Byron Bay International Film Festival.

Of Face to Face, filmmaker Michael Moore (Fahrenheit 9/11, Bowling for Columbine), said, "This is one of those rare films which grabs hold of you at the beginning and doesn't let go till the end. It is an amazing piece of cinema - riveting, thought-provoking, transformative. Only once or twice a year do I see such a film - and this year that film is Face to Face. Not only should every person in Michigan see this film - but every person in America should see this film."

Accolades

Home Media
Face to Face was released on DVD by Umbrella Entertainment in May 2012.

References

External links
 
 
 

Australian drama films
2011 films
Films based on works by David Williamson
Films directed by Michael Rymer
Films scored by Richard Gibbs
2010s English-language films